Leading Tickles is a town in the Canadian province of Newfoundland and Labrador. In 2021, the town had a population of 296, down from 407 in the Canada 2006 Census. It is located approximately 25 km Northwest of Point Leamington on the shores of Notre Dame Bay. The town boasts spectacular scenery especially in spring and early summer when many icebergs pass just off the coast.

Demographics 

See also
 List of cities and towns in Newfoundland and Labrador

References

Towns in Newfoundland and Labrador